Kim Suk-won (born April 22, 1945) was the chair of Ssangyong Business Group, one of the largest companies in the Republic of Korea, served as the President of the Boy Scouts of Korea, a member of the World Scout Committee, and Vice-Chairman of the World Scout Foundation.

In 1995, Kim was awarded the 241st Bronze Wolf, the only distinction of the World Organization of the Scout Movement, awarded by the World Scout Committee for exceptional services to world Scouting.

References

External links

complete list

rokps.or.kr 

Recipients of the Bronze Wolf Award
1945 births
Scouting in South Korea
South Korean businesspeople
Members of the National Assembly (South Korea)
Brandeis University alumni
Sogang University alumni
People from Daegu
Gimhae Kim clan
Living people